Jawahar Navodaya Vidyalaya, Jojawar (जवाहर नवोदय विद्यालय, जोजावर, Javāhar Navōdaya Vidyālaya, Jōjāvar) is a Jawahar Navodaya Vidyalaya school in district Pali in Rajasthan, India,  away from the village Jojawar in the Marwar Junction tehsil of the Pali district. This school is residence school and all  facilities to the students is free of cost. This school established in a temporary site in 1988 under 1986 education policy. Now school have buildings for all the purposes, school building, hostels, staff quarters, multi-purpose hall.

The entrance test for admission into 6th and 9th class of Jawahar Navodaya Vidyalaya, Jojawar is conducted by the Navodaya Vidyalaya Samiti. The school syllabus is CBSE pattern. There are classes being conducted from 6th standard to 12th standard.

Music, computer science and socially useful productive work are taught as optional subjects. The school has a computer room equipped with Internet, a Samsung smart classroom with 40 laptops and LCD and a music room with most of the instruments available. The school also has a library with more than 7539 books.

There are two Shiv temples on two corners of the school boundary. Locality wise place is very calm and peaceful due to the distant location of the school from the village.

Cluster
This Navodaya Vidyalaya comes under Sub-cluster II of J. C. Bose cluster in Jaipur region of Navodaya Vidyalaya Samiti (NVS). In this sub-cluster other Navodaya Vidyalaya are of Ajmer, Sirohi, Jalore, Barmer and Jodhpur districts. While Navodaya Vidyalayas of Bhilwara, Chittorgarh, Udaipur, Rajsamand, Banswara and Dungarpur come under the sub-cluster I of J. C. Bose cluster.

Migration
Under migration scheme the 30% students of 9th class migrated to JNV, Bucharwada, Diu (Daman and Diu, U.T.). Third language is accordingly Gujarati.

Principals
As of 2020, the school has had 
eight principals:

 P.C. Upadhyay: (I/C) 13/09/1988 to 04/11/1988 
 A.M. Mishra: 05/11/1988 to 24/02/1989 
 D.P. Singh: 01/07/1989 to 19/11/1996 
 J.P. Upreti: 19/11/1996 to 31/10/1999 
 R.P. Singh: 25/07/2000 to 31/12/2011
 G.Krishna Rao: from 23/04/12 to 05/09/2018
 Dr. Jagdish Chandra Kaluawat: 05/09/2018 to 30/06/2019
 Krishna Kant Joshi from 03/10/2019

References

External links
 JNV Jojawar Library website

Jawahar Navodaya Vidyalayas in Rajasthan
Education in Pali district
Educational institutions established in 1988
1988 establishments in Rajasthan